Dong is a small village in Dong valley of Anjaw district, Arunachal Pradesh, India.

It is the easternmost village in the India, near the point where India, China and Myanmar meet. It is the location of a peak, atop which tourists climb at 3 am to see the sunrise. It isn't the easternmost point of the country but it is one of the easternmost locations accessible by car. In 1999, it was found that Dong experiences the first sunrise in India, thus earning it the nickname, 'India’s Land of the Rising Sun.' The last village on the India-China LAC in Arunachal Pradesh is Kaho, which lies just north of Kibithu on the banks of Lohit River.

Location
The village can be reached on foot from Walong in a 30-minute climb.

Demographics
According to the 2011 Census of India, the village had 15 residents across 4 households. 6 were male and 9 were female. The children attend school in Walong. The local people grow rice and maize and raise pigs and chickens.

Transport
The  proposed Mago-Thingbu to Vijaynagar Arunachal Pradesh Frontier Highway along the McMahon Line, will intersect the proposed East-West Industrial Corridor Highway and will pass through this district.

See also

 North-East Frontier Agency
 List of people from Arunachal Pradesh
 Religion in Arunachal Pradesh
 Cuisine of Arunachal Pradesh
 List of institutions of higher education in Arunachal Pradesh

References
Citations

Sources

External links
NorthEastCulture

Villages in Anjaw district